Spring Flower is a Taiwanese Hokkien television series that airs on Formosa Television in Taiwan. The producers received funding from the Government Information Office to produce the series in high definition.

Plot

International Broadcast

Singapore broadcast
Due to local broadcast laws prohibiting radio or television broadcasts in Chinese dialects, the show was dubbed into Mandarin when it aired on Singapore's MediaCorp Channel 8, thus making it the first channel to broadcast the show in Mandarin. The show is currently aired on Mediacorp Channel 8 on weekends from 7pm-10pm or 7pm-9pm with English and Chinese subtitles and ended its run on 12 March 2022.

Repeat Telecast (2021)

The drama Lee’s Family Reunion ended its repeat telecast on 8 June 2021. It succeeded the 10.30 am – 12.30 pm timeslot from Monday to Thursday (Except on Fridays due to The Butterfly Chalice at 10.30am and E Getai at 11.30am) on Mediacorp Channel 8 with English and Chinese subtitles.

Music

Opening Theme Songs

Trailer Song

End Theme Songs

Taiwanese drama television series
2016 Taiwanese television series debuts
2017 Taiwanese television series endings